Uncle Buck is a 1989 American comedy film written and directed by John Hughes, and starring John Candy and Amy Madigan with supporting roles by Jean Louisa Kelly (in her film debut), Macaulay Culkin, Gaby Hoffmann, Garrett M. Brown and Elaine Bromka. The film tells the story of a bachelor who babysits his brother's rebellious teenage daughter and her younger brother and sister while the parents are away.

Uncle Buck was released in theaters on August 16, 1989, by Universal Pictures and grossed $79.2 million against a $15 million budget. The film was met with mixed reviews.

Plot

Bob and Cindy Russell and their three children, 15-year-old Tia, 8-year-old Miles, and 6-year-old Maizy, have recently moved from Indianapolis to the Chicago suburbs. Bob's brother Buck lives in a small apartment in Wrigleyville with no responsibilities, spending his time drinking and smoking cigars. Buck's girlfriend of eight years, Chanice, wants to get married and start a family, but Buck is resistant to commit. To appease her, he grudgingly agrees to work at her tire shop.

Cindy's aunt in Indianapolis calls at midnight, informing them that her father has had a heart attack. Hoping to leave immediately to be with him, Bob suggests asking Buck to come and watch the children, to which Cindy objects as she considers him to be unsuitable. As neither parent finds another alternative, they end up calling Buck. He cheerfully accepts, informing Chanice that he cannot start the job yet due to a family emergency. She assumes Buck is lying to get out of work.

Upon arriving, Buck deals with Cindy's coldness and finds himself cropped out of Bob and Cindy's wedding picture. Nevertheless, he quickly befriends Miles and Maizy, but Tia is brash and hostile as they engage in a battle of wills. Over the next few days, Buck takes the kids bowling, makes enormous pancakes for Miles' birthday, removes a drunk clown from the birthday party, berates Maizy's principal for criticizing her behavior in class, and washes laundry in the kitchen sink when the washing machine does not work. When Buck meets Tia's boyfriend Bug, he warns her about his intentions and repeatedly thwarts her plans to sneak off with him.

Buck is frequently visited by the Russells' flirtatious neighbor Marcie. Tia exacts revenge on Buck for meddling in her relationship when Chanice calls the house for Buck and Tia tells Chanice that Buck is cheating on her with Marcie. The next day, Chanice comes over to confront Buck about what she heard but is furious to find Buck dancing with Marcie in the living room.

Later when Tia sneaks out to a party, Buck decides to find her rather than go to the racetrack, begging Chanice to watch Miles and Maizy as he searches for her. At the party, believing Bug is taking advantage of her in a bedroom, Buck forces the door open by drilling out the lock but walks in on Bug with another girl. Finding Tia wandering the streets, she tearfully apologizes to him and acknowledges he was right about Bug. Buck reveals Bug bound and gagged in the trunk of his car. Buck lets him out to apologize to her. After Bug threatens to sue Buck and retracts his apology, he flees in fear after Buck strikes him with a golf ball.

Back home, Tia helps Buck reconcile with Chanice by admitting her lie and telling her that Buck would be a good husband and father. Buck also agrees to start his job at the garage, and he and Chanice reunite. Cindy's father recovers and she and Bob return home from Indianapolis. Upon entering the house, Tia surprises her mother with a hug. The entire Russell family says farewell to Buck and Chanice as they leave for Chicago, with Buck and Tia exchanging a loving wave goodbye.

Cast
 John Candy as Buck Russell, a bachelor who babysits his brother's kids.
 Jean Louisa Kelly as Tia Russell, the oldest daughter of Bob and Cindy.
 Laurie Metcalf as Marcie Dahlgren-Frost, the neighbor of the Russells who lives across the street.
 Jay Underwood as Bug, Tia's boyfriend.
 Amy Madigan as Chanice Kobolowski, the girlfriend of Buck and proprietor of a tire shop.
 Macaulay Culkin as Miles Russell, the only son of Bob and Cindy.
 Gaby Hoffmann as Maizy Russell, the youngest daughter of Bob and Cindy.
 Elaine Bromka as Cindy Russell, the wife of Bob.
 Garrett M. Brown as Bob Russell, the brother of Buck.
 Suzanne Shepherd as Anita Hoargarth, the strict assistant principal of Maizy's school.
 Mike Starr as Pooter the Clown, a birthday clown who Buck rejects for being drunk.
 Brian Tarantina as E. Roger Coswell, a friend of Buck.
 William Windom as Voice of Mr. Hatfield, the unseen neighbor of the Russells who Buck accidentally awakens upon his arrival.
 Dennis Cockrum as Pal

Additional voices by Granville Ames, Patricia Arquette, Jack Blessing, Garin Bouble, Ramey Ellis, Leigh French, Tim Hoskins, Laura Jacoby, Todd Larson, Devon Odessa, Julie Payne, and Arnold F. Turner.

Production

The film was the first one directed, written, and produced by John Hughes under a multi-picture agreement deal with Universal. Filming began on January 4, 1989, in Chicago. The company decided to keep the production facilities and locations as close as possible. The vacant New Trier High School in Northfield, Illinois, was chosen for the production facility. Three of its gyms were converted into sound stages on which several sets were constructed including the two-leveled interior of the Russell House, Buck's bedroom, and smaller sets. The school was also equipped to suit the needs of the cast and crew behind-the-scenes, classrooms for the young actors, offices, dressing rooms, wardrobe department, editing facilities, a special effects shop, equipment storage areas, and a projection booth. Production designer John Corso began designing the sets in October 1988 and within seven weeks his construction crew of twelve carpenters and five painters began work on the two levels of the Russell house. The elementary school corridor, the boys' restroom, the principal's office, and a classroom were filmed at Wilmette's Romona Elementary School. A colonial-style house in Evanston was chosen for the exterior of the Russell house. The exteriors and practical locations were shot in Chicago, Cicero, Skokie, Northbrook, Wilmette, Winnetka, Glencoe, and Riverwoods.

Reception

Box office
The film earned $8.8 million on its opening weekend in 1,804 theaters and was placed No. 1 at the box office. The film stayed in first place for three more weeks before being bumped down to second by Sea of Love. Its US earnings were 18th in 1989, and the film has earned nearly $80 million worldwide since its release.

Critical reception
Upon release, the film received mixed reviews from critics. Review aggregator Rotten Tomatoes has given it a "Fresh" score of 62%, based on 26 reviews, with an average rating of 5.9/10. The site's critical consensus reads: "Uncle Buck has its ups and downs, but there's undeniable comedic magic that comes from uniting John Hughes, John Candy, and a house full of precocious kids." On Metacritic, which assigns a normalized rating, the film has a score of 51 out of 100 based on 12 critics, indicating "mixed or average reviews". Roger Ebert of The Chicago Sun-Times gave the movie 1.5 stars out of a possible 4, writing that Uncle Buck was unusually bitter and angry for a Hughes movie: "...Hughes is usually the master of the right note, the right line of dialogue, and this time there's an uncomfortable undercurrent in the material."

Television series

A television series was broadcast on CBS in 1990. It starred Kevin Meaney as Buck, a slob who drinks and smokes. When Bob and Cindy die in a car accident, he is named as the guardian of Tia, Miles, and Maizy. The show was not received well by TV critics. After it was moved to Friday, in an attempt by CBS to establish a comedy night there, its ratings quickly plummeted and it was cancelled.

In June 2016, ABC premiered a second television adaptation featuring an African-American cast with Mike Epps in the title role, James Lesure as his brother, and Nia Long as Buck's sister-in-law. It suffered a similar fate as the previous TV adaptation, as it was poorly received by critics and then canceled after only eight episodes.

Remake
In 1991, the film was remade in Malayalam language and released as Uncle Bun.

Home media

The film was released on VHS and Laserdisc in 1989, and on DVD in 1998 and 2003. On August 26, 2008, it appeared on the DVD box-set "John Candy Comedy Favourites Collection", along with The Great Outdoors (1988) and Going Berserk (1983). In 2011, it was released on Blu-ray Disc for the first time on February 8, and released again on June 28, on Blu-ray with a DVD and a digital copy.

References

Further reading
  A recent, extended review of the film and its 2012 Blu-ray release.

External links

 
 
 
 
 
 Uncle Buck at the 80s Movie Gateway

Uncle Buck (franchise)
1989 films
1989 comedy films
American comedy films
1980s English-language films
Films about families
Films scored by Ira Newborn
Films adapted into television shows
Films directed by John Hughes (filmmaker)
Films produced by John Hughes (filmmaker)
Films set in Chicago
Films shot in Illinois
Films with screenplays by John Hughes (filmmaker)
Universal Pictures films
Films about siblings
1980s American films